Events in the year 2011 in South Korea.

Incumbents
 President: Lee Myung-bak, President of South Korea (2008–2013)
 Prime Minister: Kim Hwang-sik, Prime Minister of South Korea (2010–2013)

Events 

 2011 South Korean University Tuition Crisis
 January 18–21: Operation Dawn of Gulf of Aden
 February 9: The first military talks with North Korea in months abruptly end with the North walking out.
 March: The Posco Tower-Songdo in the Songdo International Business District, South Korea is completed. It surpasses the previous record holder for being South Korea's tallest, the Samsung Tower Palace G.
 March 2: 2011 Gyeongryeolbi island fishing incident
 April 27: The first of 2 South Korean by-elections
 April 27: Naneun Ggomsuda debuted. 
 July 6: The International Olympic Committee awards the 2018 Winter Olympics to Pyeongchang.
 July 25–28: 2011 Seoul floods
 July 28: Asiana Airlines Flight 991
 August 24: 2011 Seoul Free Lunch referendum
 September 15: 2011 South Korea blackout
 November 29: The Korean Labor Unions Confederation is founded.
 October 26: The 2nd by-election and the accompanying DDoS attacks
 December 12: 2011 Incheon fishing incident
 December 15: Brawl Busters video game is released.

Film
 List of South Korean films of 2011
 List of 2011 box office number-one films in South Korea
 32nd Blue Dragon Film Awards
 48th Grand Bell Awards
 16th Busan International Film Festival

Television

 2011 KBS Drama Awards
 4th Korea Drama Awards
 2011 MBC Drama Awards
 2011 SBS Drama Awards

Music
 2011 in South Korean music
 List of number-one hits of 2011
 List of Gaon Album Chart number ones of 2011
 List of number-one Streaming Songs of 2011
 2011 Mnet Asian Music Awards

Sport
 South Korea at the 2011 Asian Winter Games
 South Korea at the 2011 Summer Universiade
 South Korea at the 2011 World Aquatics Championships
 South Korea at the 2011 World Championships in Athletics
 2011 in South Korean football
 2011 Korea Professional Baseball season
 2011 World Taekwondo Championships
 2011 World Championships in Athletics
 2011 Asian Fencing Championships
 2011 Korea Open Super Series Premier
 2010 Korean Baduk League
 2011 South Korean Figure Skating Championships
 World Cyber Games 2011
 2011 Asian Amateur Boxing Championships
 2011 Korean Grand Prix

References 

 
2010s in South Korea
Years of the 21st century in South Korea
South Korea
South Korea